WHOT may refer to:

 WHOT (AM), a radio station (1590 AM) licensed to serve Palm River-Clair Mel, Florida, United States
 WHOT-FM, a radio station (101.1 FM) licensed to serve Youngstown, Ohio, United States
 WUVG-DT, a television station, licensed to serve Athens, Georgia, which held the call sign WHOT-TV from 1999 to 2001
 WNIO, a radio station (1390 AM) licensed to serve Youngstown, Ohio, United States, which held the call sign WHOT from 1990 to 1994
 WGFT, a radio station (1330 AM) licensed to serve Campbell, Ohio, United States, which held the call sign WHOT from 1963 to 1990
 WHTX (AM), a radio station (1570 AM) licensed to serve Campbell, Ohio, United States, which held the call sign WHOT from 1955 to 1963
 WDND (1490 AM), a radio station licensed to serve South Bend, Indiana, United States, which held the call sign WHOT from 1944 to 1955